Julian Lenz (born 17 February 1993 in Giessen) is a German tennis player. He has an ATP career high singles ranking of world No. 227, achieved in January 2020. In doubles, he reached his career-high ranking of No. 162 in June 2021.

Career
Lenz won the 2011 US Open boys' doubles title, partnering Robin Kern.

He played college tennis for the Baylor University.

He made his ATP Tour main draw debut by qualifying for both singles and doubles at the 2019 Hamburg European Open. In singles, he lost to world No. 10 Fabio Fognini in the first round. In doubles, he and partner Daniel Masur upset compatriots Alexander and Mischa Zverev after saving two match points in the opening round.

Junior Grand Slam finals

Doubles: 1 (1 title)

ATP Challenger and ITF Futures/World Tennis Tour finals

Singles: 8 (3–5)

Doubles: 15 (6–9)

References

External links

1993 births
Living people
German male tennis players
US Open (tennis) junior champions
People from Grünberg, Hesse
Sportspeople from Giessen (region)
Grand Slam (tennis) champions in boys' doubles
Baylor Bears men's tennis players
Tennis people from Hesse